Hydra is the second studio album by American rock band Toto, released in 1979. It reached #37 on the Billboard Pop Albums. While most of the album's singles failed to make any impact in the charts, "99", a song inspired by the 1971 science fiction movie THX 1138, reached #26 on the Billboard Hot 100.

In 2013, Toto's guitarist Steve Lukather said of the album: You get successful with something, it’s always the whole thing where you don’t want to repeat it. So we tried something a little different with Hydra, and it sold well, although it might have been a little bit rushed for us. And here's some irony for you -- Rolling Stone beat up on the first album, and then when they reviewed Hydra, the opening line of the review is something like, "It doesn’t have the magic of the first album." We're immediately pissing ourselves on the floor with laughter. Who are these cats? Do they think we have amnesia? We were just following our muses, man. We were following our own rules and we didn't want to listen to anybody.

Reception

Though a commercial success, Hydra was a far less popular album than the band's top-selling debut.  AllMusic suggested this was due to Toto's failure to establish a distinctive, recognizable sound on either Hydra or their debut, which would have allowed listeners to immediately identify Toto's major hits with the band themselves.  They also speculated that most listeners were not familiar with the film (namely, THX 1138) on which the song "99" was based, and thus found the lyrics hopelessly cryptic, preventing the single from becoming as big a hit as it might have been.

Critical response to the album was mixed. AllMusic's retrospective review made little judgment on the quality (noting only as an aside that the songs were "well-played"), instead discussing why it had failed to match the commercial success of their debut.

Track listing

Personnel

Toto
 Bobby Kimball – lead and backing vocals
 Steve Lukather – guitars, lead and backing vocals
 Steve Porcaro – synthesizers, electronics, synthesizer programming
 David Paich – piano, keyboards, lead and backing vocals
 David Hungate – bass guitar, guitars
 Jeff Porcaro – drums, percussion

Additional musicians
 Lenny Castro – percussion
 Michael Boddicker – synthesizer samples
 Roger Linn – assistant synthesizer programming
 Marty Paich – string arrangements

Production
 Produced by Tom Knox, Reggie Fisher and Toto.
 Engineered and Mixed by Tom Knox and Dana Latham.
 Assistant Engineer – Stephen McManus
 Mastered by David Donnelly
 Art Direction – Jim Hagopian, Tony Lane and Jeff Porcaro.
 Design – Philip Garris
 Photography – Jim Hagopian
 Calligraphy – Mike Manoogian
 Management – The Fitzgerald Hartley Co.

Singles
 "99" / "Hydra"
 "St George and the Dragon" / "A Secret Love"
 "All Us Boys" / "Hydra" (released in US)

Charts

Weekly charts

Year-end charts

Certifications

External links
"Hydra" at discogs

References

1979 albums
Toto (band) albums
Columbia Records albums
Albums recorded at Sunset Sound Recorders
Funk rock albums by American artists
Hard rock albums by American artists
Rhythm and blues albums by American artists